Alfred Olivier Hero Jr. (February 7, 1924 – January 20, 2006) was an American political scientist.

Hero was born on February 7, 1924, in New Orleans to parents  Alfred O. Hero Sr. and Effel A. Pearson. Hero Jr. graduated from the United States Military Academy in 1945, and served with the 309th Infantry Regiment, itself a part of the 78th Infantry Division, until 1948. Between 1948 and 1950, he attended Vanderbilt University, completing master's degrees in political science and psychology. From 1950, he worked in the Human Research Office of the Assistant Chief of Staff for Personnel, a division of the United States Department of the Army. Hero resigned from the army in 1953 to pursue a doctorate in international relations from George Washington University. He then worked as an editor for the journal International Organization and as executive secretary of the World Peace Foundation until 1982. Subsequently, he became a visiting scholar at Harvard University's Center for International Affairs and a visiting professor at the University of Toronto.

Hero and his wife Barbara raised four children, including Alfred O. Hero III. Hero . died on January 20, 2006.

Selected publications

References

1924 births
2006 deaths
American political scientists
United States Military Academy alumni
Military personnel from Louisiana
Writers from New Orleans
20th-century American male writers
20th-century American non-fiction writers
American male non-fiction writers
International relations scholars
Political science journal editors
George Washington University alumni
Vanderbilt University alumni
United States Army personnel of World War II
20th-century political scientists